James Riley "The Baker" Blake (born December 28, 1979) is an American former professional tennis player. He was known for his speed and powerful, flat forehand. During his career, Blake amassed 24 singles finals appearances (winning 10 of them), while his career-high singles ranking was world No. 4. His career highlights included reaching the final of the 2006 Tennis Masters Cup, the semifinals of the 2008 Beijing Olympics (upsetting world No. 1 Roger Federer en route), the quarterfinals of the 2008 Australian Open and 2005 and 2006 US Open, as well as two titles at the Hopman Cup (2003, 2004) and being the American men's singles No. 1. Blake was a key performer for the victorious United States 2007 Davis Cup team, going 2–0 in the championship tie vs. Russia at second singles.

In 2005, Blake was presented with the Comeback Player of the Year award for his remarkable return to the tour. Later, in 2008, Blake was awarded another honor by the ATP, where he was named the Arthur Ashe Humanitarian of the Year.

Blake's autobiography, Breaking Back: How I Lost Everything and Won Back My Life, co-written with Andrew Friedman, discussed his comeback after his 2004 season.  It was released on July 3. 2007, and debuted at No. 22 on the New York Times Best Seller list.

Blake announced that he would retire from professional tennis after the 2013 US Open, where he suffered a first round singles loss in five sets against Ivo Karlovic and a three-set doubles loss.

Early life and education
Blake was born in Yonkers, New York, to an African American father, Thomas Reynolds Blake, and a British mother, Betty. He has a brother Thomas, who has also been a professional tennis player, and three older half-brothers: Jason, Christopher, and Howard, and a half-sister Michelle.

Blake started playing tennis at the age of five alongside his older brother Thomas. When he was 13, he was diagnosed with severe scoliosis, and for five years as a teenager he was forced to wear a full-length back brace for 18 hours a day, though not while playing tennis.

The Blake family moved to Fairfield, Connecticut when Blake's father's job selling surgical supplies took him from New York to Hartford, Connecticut. Blake attended Fairfield High School, where a schoolmate and childhood friend was future musician John Mayer. Blake was inspired to pursue tennis after hearing his role model Arthur Ashe speak to the Harlem Junior Tennis Program. Brian Barker was his first (and longtime) coach. Blake left Harvard University, where he was a member of the A.D. Club, after his sophomore year to pursue a career in professional tennis.
In 2018, he was elected into the ITA Collegiate Hall of Fame.

Career

2001–2004: Making a name for himself

2001
At the age of 21, Blake saw his first Davis Cup action in 2001 against India and became the third person of African-American heritage to play for the Davis Cup for the United States (after Arthur Ashe and MaliVai Washington). Ranked no. 120 in the world, Blake accepted a wild card into Cincinnati Masters. He beat a qualifier and Arnaud Clément to reach the round of 16, where he met Patrick Rafter. Blake came close to winning the first set (falling in a tiebreak), and after dropping the second set, Rafter, according to Blake's autobiography, complimented him at the net and boosted his confidence immeasurably by saying, "Now do you believe you can beat someone like me, or even me?" Blake's name became more recognizable worldwide after he pushed the eventual champion Lleyton Hewitt to five sets at the US Open.

2002
In January 2002, Blake won the 2002 USTA Waikoloa Challenger in Hawaii. A month later in Memphis he posted his first win over a top-10 ranked opponent, Tommy Haas, who was then ranked no. 5, and reached the final, losing to Andy Roddick. He reached the quarterfinals at the ATP Masters Series (AMS) event in Rome in May and the final at Newport in July. In August, in Cincinnati, he won his first career ATP Tour title and his first ATP Masters Series title: it came in doubles with Todd Martin, making Blake the first African-American male to win a title of any kind in Cincinnati's 101-year history. He was also the first African-American to reach a final in Cincinnati since 1969, when Arthur Ashe reached the doubles finals with Charlie Pasarell. The next week in Washington, he won his first ATP Tour singles title, beating Andre Agassi in the semifinals and Paradorn Srichaphan in the final. At the US Open, he reached the third round, where he again faced the top-ranked and world number one Lleyton Hewitt for the rematch of the previous year. In an entertaining match Blake was again defeated in five sets.

2003
In 2003, his best results were a quarterfinals appearance at Indian Wells; a round of 16 finish at the Australian Open, Cincinnati, and Miami; a semifinal appearance at San Jose, and a finals appearance at Long Island, where he lost to Srichaphan. Blake was eliminated from the US Open in the 3rd round by Roger Federer.

2004
2004 was a difficult year for Blake. In May, while practicing with Robby Ginepri for the Masters event in Rome, he broke his neck when he slipped on the clay and collided with the net post.  Blake fractured his seventh vertebra, but did not sustain any nerve damage and was ultimately able to make a full recovery from the injury.  In July, his father died of stomach cancer. At the same time, Blake developed shingles, which temporarily paralyzed half his face and blurred his vision.

2005–2008: Rising to the elite and Top 10 years

2005
Blake's injuries and personal issues caused him to post relatively poor results for the first half of 2005. By April his ranking was 210. He decided to play the Challenger circuit, the "minor leagues" of tennis, in order to regain confidence and get more matches. In May he entered events in Tunica, Mississippi and Forest Hills, New York, and won both. He rejoined the ATP circuit and by August reached the final at the International Series event in Washington, D.C., where he fell to Roddick. He was given a wild card into AMS Cincinnati, drawing Federer in the first round. He then won the Pilot Pen Tennis tournament in New Haven, Connecticut, defeating Feliciano López in the final. After New Haven he was ranked 49.

Blake accepted a wildcard into the US Open where he had a memorable run. After defeating No. 2 Rafael Nadal in the round of 32, Blake beat Tommy Robredo in four sets to reach the quarterfinals where he faced Andre Agassi. The late-evening match is considered one of the greatest classics in the tournament's history. Blake was up two sets and a break in the third when Agassi made a comeback to eventually win in a fifth-set tiebreak. After the match Agassi said, "I wasn't the winner, tennis was". Later in October at the Stockholm Open, Blake won his third ATP tour title, defeating Srichaphan in the final. Blake finished 2005 ranked 22 in the world.

2006
At the beginning of 2006, Blake won the title at Sydney, taking his fourth ATP tour title defeating Russian Igor Andreev in the final. At the Australian Open he was seeded 20th, and despite losing in the third round to Spaniard Tommy Robredo he broke into the top 20 for the first time in his career. In March he beat Hewitt in the final at Las Vegas for his fifth ATP tour title. At the first AMS event of the year Indian Wells, Blake defeated Robredo in the third round and world No. 2 Nadal in the semifinals, reaching his first career ATP Masters Series singles final, losing in the final to Federer. By reaching the final, Blake became the first African-American man since Arthur Ashe to reach the world's top 10.

At the French Open he defeated Spaniard Nicolás Almagro in four sets in the second round, to become the last remaining American, and then was beaten by Frenchman Gaël Monfils in five sets. Beginning the grass court season at the Stella Artois Championships, he defeated Andy Roddick in the semifinals, losing to Lleyton Hewitt in the final. Ranked No. 5, Blake took part in the International Series at Indianapolis. He won the singles title, defeating Roddick (for the second time in 2006). At the US Open he reached the quarterfinals, losing to top seed and defending champion Roger Federer. In that match Blake won his first ever set against Federer, winning the third set in a tiebreaker 11–9.

In his debut appearance at the Thailand Open in Bangkok, Blake won his seventh singles title, defeating Jarkko Nieminen in the quarterfinals, Marat Safin in the semifinals, and Ivan Ljubičić (for the first time) in the final.
Two weeks later Blake won his fifth title of 2006, defending his 2005 title in Stockholm, defeating Jarkko Nieminen. For the first time, Blake qualified for the Tennis Masters Cup in Shanghai. He went 2–1 in the Gold Group, defeating No. 2 Nadal and No. 3 Nikolay Davydenko, while losing to No. 6 Tommy Robredo. He qualified for the semifinals, beating defending champion David Nalbandian, losing the final to Federer. Blake finished 2006 at a career-high World Number 4 and as the highest-ranked American tennis player.

2007
In 2007 Blake won at the Sydney International for the second consecutive year. However, he then suffered a disappointing loss in the Round of 16 at the Australian Open, losing to tenth seed and eventual finalist Fernando González. In February, Blake made it to the final of the Delray Beach tournament, but lost it to the Belgian Xavier Malisse in three tight sets.

At the 2007 Tennis Channel Open in Las Vegas, as the defending champion, he was involved with a deep controversy. It was one of the several tournaments experimenting with the new round robin format, and Blake had lost his first match to Evgeny Korolev. Korolev lost his other match to Juan Martín del Potro. In order to advance to the quarterfinals, Blake had to defeat Del Potro in straight sets while losing five games or less. This would result in a three-way tie, with Blake losing the fewest games. With Blake leading 6–1, 3–1, Del Potro retired. This eliminated Del Potro from the three-way tie as he failed to complete one of his matches. Korolev then moved on to the next round, breaking the tie as he had defeated Blake in their direct match. Soon after, the organizers overruled the tournament guidelines, giving Blake a place in the quarterfinals. The following morning however, they changed the decision once again and as a result, Korolev re-advanced to the quarterfinals, while Blake was sent away from the tournament. Shortly after this incident, the ATP decided to cancel the round robin format, reverting any tournaments planning a round robin draw to the standard single-elimination draw.

During the summer hardcourt season, he advanced to his second career ATP Masters Series final. At AMS Cincinnati, he beat Alejandro Falla, Nicolas Kiefer, Juan Carlos Ferrero, Sam Querrey and Nikolay Davydenko en route to the final before falling to Roger Federer. He won the singles title at Penn Pilot in New Haven, Connecticut, and reached the final at Los Angeles, losing to Radek Štěpánek in three sets after having three set points in the first set. In the second round of the 2007 US Open, he won his first career five-set match against Fabrice Santoro. Blake made it to the fourth round, where he lost to No. 10 Tommy Haas in five sets, despite having match points in the fifth set. In September Blake and the rest of the US Davis Cup team defeated Sweden to reach the finals against Russia.

Blake lost in the third round of Paris to Richard Gasquet and thus finished outside the top eight players, losing his chance to defend the points he gained as finalist in the 2006 Tennis Masters Cup. In the 2007 Davis Cup finals Blake won his match against Mikhail Youzhny after Andy Roddick had beaten Dmitry Tursunov in the first rubber. The next day Bob and Mike Bryan won the doubles rubber over Igor Andreev and Nikolay Davydenko, sealing the Davis Cup win for the United States. Blake also defeated Tursunov in the last match of the finals to give Team USA 4–1 win.

2008
At the Australian Open, Blake defeated his first round opponent, Chilean Nicolás Massú. He then defeated compatriot Michael Russell. In the third round, he fought back from two sets down to beat French veteran Sébastien Grosjean who had beaten him in each of their three previous meetings. In the fourth round, Blake beat Marin Čilić in three sets to advance to the quarterfinals, his best showing yet down under. In the quarterfinal, Blake faced world No. 1 Roger Federer, and fell in straight sets. Although out of the Australian Open, Blake's ranking jumped back into the top 10 to No. 9 following his best performance in the tournament yet.

In Delray Beach, Blake made it to the final for the second consecutive year, but fell to No. 244 Kei Nishikori of Japan in three sets in the final. At the 2008 Pacific Life Open, Blake reached the quarter-finals before losing to Rafael Nadal in three sets. They met again in the next tournament at the 2008 Miami Masters also in the quarter-finals, and again Blake lost to Nadal in three sets. Blake then started the clay court season at the River Oaks International tournament in Houston, Texas. In his second ATP final of the year and his first career clay-court final, Blake fell to Spaniard Marcel Granollers.

In August 2008, Blake represented the United States as one of its three men's singles tennis players in the Beijing Olympics. In the quarterfinals, he gained one of the biggest wins of his career with his first ever win over Roger Federer 6–4, 7–6. At the time, Federer was ranked as the world's No. 1 men's player. His semifinal match was against Fernando González, the Men's Singles bronze medalist at the 2004 Olympics in Athens. Blake had a triple match point in the final set, but would go on to lose 11–9. He then lost the bronze medal match to Serbian Novak Djokovic.

In the US Open, Blake was stretched to a 5 set thriller against American teenager Donald Young in the first round. Blake easily won his second round match after Steve Darcis retired and then lost to friend and fellow American Mardy Fish in the third round in straight sets.

2009–2013: Later years

2009

Blake defeated Frank Dancevic in the first round of the Australian Open. His success continued in the second round after deposing of Frenchman Sébastien de Chaunac in a match laden with spectator noise and bad line calls. Blake went on to face the 18th seed, Igor Andreev, in the third round and beat him. He lost in the fourth round in straight sets to the 2008 runner-up Jo-Wilfried Tsonga.

At the 2009 Estoril Open Blake advanced to his first clay-court final on European soil, after beating second seed and former Estoril Open champion Nikolay Davydenko in a rain-interrupted semi-final that was carried over due to bad light. Blake was defeated by Spain's Albert Montañés later that day in the finals.  The 28-year-old Montanes saved two match points at 4–5 in the second set and fought back to beat fourth-seeded Blake in two hours and 14 minutes.

At the Aegon Championships at Queen's Club, Blake defeated Ivan Ljubičić, Sam Querrey, and Mikhail Youzhny to reach the semi-finals. He then reached the final after Andy Roddick retired with an ankle injury in the first set when the score was tied at 4 games all. He then went on to lose in the final to Andy Murray. After being eliminated in the first round of the singles, Blake partnered with compatriot Mardy Fish at the Wimbledon Men's Doubles. The Americans advanced to the semi-finals where they lost to defending champions Daniel Nestor and Nenad Zimonjić despite winning the first two sets.

Following a 3rd round loss at the 2009 US Open to Spain's Tommy Robredo, Blake split with longtime coach Brian Barker. He was replaced by Kelly Jones.

2010
At the 2010 Australian Open, Blake lost to fourth seed and US Open champion Juan Martín del Potro in the second round in five sets (8–10 final set). He then missed the clay court season due to a knee injury. Blake returned to action at Wimbledon, where he lost in the first round to Robin Haase, during which Blake accused ESPN commentator and former WTA player Pam Shriver of disrupting play due to her overly loud commentary from the box situated above the court behind him. This led to a verbal exchange between the two during the match. After the match, Blake declared that if his knee problems did not subside he would consider retirement. Blake, who refused to take any anti-inflammatories for his knee, called his performance "embarrassing" and said "I can't beat these guys at 80 percent." Despite these comments, Blake played the US Summer hard court season, and reached the third round of the 2010 US Open, where he lost to eventual finalist Novak Djokovic. Blake finished the year ranked outside the Top 100 for the first time since 2000.

2011-2013
Between the beginning of 2011-2013, Blake remained ranked outside the world's top 50, due to recurring injuries and loss of form. During the three seasons, he reached a single ATP-tour semifinal, at the 2011 Stockholm Open. At the US Open in August 2013, Blake announced his retirement.
In 2019, he was elected to the Collegiate Hall of Fame.

Playing style

Blake was primarily an offensive baseliner. Blake was known for possessing one of the most powerful forehands in the game, with a solid transition game, and an effective serve and volley. Blake also possessed extremely quick footwork, although many claimed that he needed to work on changing direction. Blake's reputation as a "shotmaker," combined with potentially high-error flat groundstrokes made his style of play notably flashy, characterized by both a high number of winners and unforced errors. In turn, this made Blake's game somewhat streaky, as evidenced by his playing history.

Equipment and endorsements
Blake worked with Prince to create a new racquet with Prince's O3 technology. However, he did not feel comfortable with this racquet. So, he switched back to the Dunlop Sport Aerogel 200, then the 4D 200, for the 2009 season. He changed to Wilson at the start of the 2010 season, using the new Six.One Tour strung with Luxilon Big Banger Alu Power 16L strings at high tension (60+ pounds). He did not feel comfortable with this racquet either. Therefore, he switched back to Dunlop again. After the US Open of 2010, he began to test out rackets for Head. As August 26, 2011, he announced he will use Donnay rackets as his choice and using a customized Donnay X-Dual Pro. His clothing sponsor is Fila, with whom he started working in 2009 after using Nike for most his career. He has his own clothing line named Thomas Reynolds Collection after his father.

Blake signed an endorsement deal with Evian in 2005 and his contract was extended in 2008.

Personal life
Blake married publicist Emily Snider in Del Mar, California, in 2012. The couple have two daughters.

Blake enjoys golf and basketball and is a fan of the New York Mets. He was featured on Bravo's second edition of Celebrity Poker Showdown but placed 2nd after losing to Maura Tierney.

Blake was also a red pro on Full Tilt Poker, though he has not been active there since shortly before Black Friday. He appeared in People magazine's Sexiest Man Alive issue. He is good friends with singer/songwriter John Mayer, who also attended Fairfield High School. When Blake was invited by Virginia's Anthem to do a cancer charity game honoring his late father, he invited Mayer, Andy Roddick, and Gavin DeGraw to perform.

2015 NYPD incident
On September 9, 2015, Blake was thrown down to the sidewalk, handcuffed, and arrested by a plainclothes New York City Police Department officer in front of the Grand Hyatt New York after being mistaken for a suspect of interest. The officers were relying on a witness and photo of a suspect that looked similar to Blake: they mistook him for a credit-card fraud suspect staying in the same hotel. Commissioner William Bratton apologized for the mistake and stated the "arrest raised serious questions about [the officer's] actions" but denied allegations of racism. Blake sued, but withdrew his claim, saying he wasn't looking for financial compensation, "on the condition that the city establish a legal fellowship to investigate police misconduct and advocate for victims of brutality."

The violence of the arrest has prompted Blake to take a more active stand on police brutality against minorities. He has requested a meeting with Bratton and New York Mayor Bill de Blasio. He has also written a book, Ways of Grace: Stories of Activism, Adversity, and How Sports Can Bring Us Together, published in June 2017 that details the incident and his shift to activism as a result. Blake was subsequently sued for defamation by the officer who had mistakenly arrested Blake as the book portrayed the officer "as a racist and a goon". The lawsuit was dismissed by a judge in September 2018.

Philanthropy
In 2008 Blake established The James Blake Foundation, which "invests vital seed money at the leading-edge of science: speed up the most promising work, and shortening the time it takes to turn lab discoveries into better treatments for patients." Since 2005, he has hosted Anthem Live!, a charity tennis exhibition and musical event in Virginia and New York City to raise money for cancer research. In July 2008, Blake established the Thomas Blake, Sr. Memorial Research Fund to support cancer research at Memorial Sloan Kettering Cancer Center. The fund was named in memory of his father, who died from gastric cancer in 2004. Nike and Fila, which sponsored Blake, created T-shirts for Blake's charity, the J-Block program, and proceeds went to the Cancer Research Fund.

Significant finals

Olympic Games

Singles: 1 (1 runner-up)

Year-end championships finals

Singles: 1 (1 runner-up)

Masters 1000 finals

Singles: 2 (2 runners-up)

Doubles: 1 (1 title)

ATP career finals

Singles: 24 (10 titles, 14 runners-up)

Doubles: 10 (7 titles, 3 runners-up)

Team tournaments: 3 (3–0)

Performance timelines

Singles

Doubles

Top 10 wins

Notes

References

Further reading
Blake, James; Friedman, Andrew L. (2007). Breaking back : How I lost everything and won back my life. New York: Harper Collins.

External links

James Blake official website
 
 
 

1979 births
Living people
African-American male tennis players
American male tennis players
American people of English descent
Harvard Crimson men's tennis players
Olympic tennis players of the United States
Sportspeople from Fairfield, Connecticut
Sportspeople from Yonkers, New York
Tennis people from Connecticut
Tennis players from Tampa, Florida
Tennis people from New York (state)
Tennis players at the 2008 Summer Olympics
Hopman Cup competitors
American autobiographers
Writers from New York (state)
21st-century African-American sportspeople
20th-century African-American sportspeople